Breathitt County Jail is a historic building in Jackson, Kentucky, United States. The Works Progress Administration built it around 1934 as part of their work in Breathitt County. The ashlar stone jail has a three-bay facade, stone chimneys on each side, and a central porch with an arched doorway. Breathitt County Jail was added to the National Register of Historic Places on February 21, 1986.

References

Neoclassical architecture in Kentucky
Jails on the National Register of Historic Places in Kentucky
National Register of Historic Places in Breathitt County, Kentucky
1934 establishments in Kentucky
Government buildings completed in 1934
Works Progress Administration in Kentucky